Reinhold Martin (born 1964) is an American architectural historian and professor. He currently serves as Professor of Architecture in the Graduate School of Architecture, Planning, and Preservation at Columbia University, where he directed the Temple Hoyne Buell Center for the Study of American Architecture. He is also a member of the Institute for Comparative Literature and Society and the Committee on Global Thought at Columbia. Until 2008, Martin was a partner in the architectural firm Martin/Baxi Architects with Kadambari Baxi.

Education 
He has a Bachelor of Architecture from Rensselaer Polytechnic Institute and a Graduate Diploma from the Architectural Association. In 1999 Martin received his Ph.D from the Princeton University School of Architecture. His dissertation was entitled Architecture and Organization, USA c. 1956.

Publications
The Urban Apparatus: Mediapolitics and the City. Minneapolis: University of Minnesota Press, 2016. 
Mediators: Aesthetics, Politics, and the City. Minneapolis: University of Minnesota Press, 2014. 
Utopia's Ghost: Architecture and Postmodernism, Again. Minneapolis, Minn.: University of Minnesota Press, 2010. 
The Organizational Complex: Architecture, Media, and Corporate Space. Cambridge, Mass.: MIT Press, 2003. 
(with Kadambari Baxi) Multi-National City: Architectural Itineraries. Barcelona: Actar, 2007. 
(with Kadambari Baxi) Entropia. London: Black Dog Pub, 2000 
(with Kadambari Baxi) Propositions. London: Black Dog Pub, 1993. 
(with Jacob Moore and Susanne Schindler) The Art of Inequality: Architecture, Housing, and Real Estate : A Provisional Report. New York: Temple Hoyne Buell Center for the Study of American Architecture, Columbia University, 2015. 
(edited, with Barry Bergdoll) Foreclosed: Rehousing the American Dream. New York, N.Y: Museum of Modern Art, 2012. 
In 2000 Martin founded the journal Grey Room together with Branden Joseph and Felicity Scott.

References

External links 

 Reinhold Martin on Archdaily
 Reinhold Martin on Archinect
 Risk: Excerpts from the Environmental Division of Labor
Utopia's Ghost: Postmodernism Reconsidered (February 28 - May 25, 2008). Exhibition at the Canadian Centre for Architecture. Curated by Reinhold Martin, Columbia University, with Cristina Goberna, Brian Ackley, Marta Caldeira, Meir Lobaton Corona, Greta Hansen, Katherine Heck, Nika Grabar, Sharif Khalje, Karen Kubey, Ciro Miguel, Troy Therrien, Susan Thompson, Eirini Tsachrelia, Dimitra Tsachrelia, Elena Vanz, and Micheal Young.
 https://www.worldcat.org/identities/lccn-no99033835/

1964 births
Living people
20th-century American architects
American architectural historians
American male non-fiction writers
Princeton University School of Architecture alumni
Columbia Graduate School of Architecture, Planning and Preservation faculty
21st-century American architects